Seidō, Seido can mean:

 Seidō juku, a style of traditional karate founded by Tadashi Nakamura.
 Seidokaikan, a style of full contact karate founded by Kazuyoshi Ishii.
 Kyushu Seido-kai, a yakuza organization based in Kyushu
 A fictional high school from Battlefield Baseball
 A realm in the fictional universe of Mortal Kombat